T2D can refer to:
 Type 2 Diabetes
 Technology Transfer Database
 Type-2 Copper-Depleted
 Douglas T2D, an American twin-engined torpedo bomber, 1927–1937